The 1875 Waikouaiti by-election was a by-election held on 3 May 1875 in the  electorate during the 5th New Zealand Parliament.

The by-election was caused by the resignation of the incumbent MP John Lillie Gillies. The by-election was won by George McLean, who had represented the electorate in 1871–72. He was opposed by Francis Rich who had previously represented the electorate in 1869–70.

Results
The following table gives the election result:

References

Waikouaiti 1875
1875 elections in New Zealand
Politics of Otago
May 1875 events
Waikouaiti